Steve Serby is a sports reporter who currently covers the NFL for the New York Post.  Although known primarily as a New York Jets beat reporter, he has also written many columns on other NFL franchises, particularly the New York Giants. He has also written or co-authored books on several different sports and sports figures.

In football circles, he is remembered for a physical confrontation with Jets quarterback Richard Todd in which Serby was pushed into a locker as a result of Serby's support for back-up Matt Robinson for the starter's job. Al Sharpton verbally attacked both Steve Serby and his employer for a column in which Serby commended Tom Coughlin for putting star wide receiver Plaxico Burress on the injured reserve list after an incident where Burress shot himself in the leg with an unlicensed firearm.

References

External links
 Serby Charges Todd
 Charges Dropped
Fight Club
NY Post Sports Columnists
Rev. Al Sharpton slams Post for 'racist' column about Plaxico Burress

Year of birth missing (living people)
Living people
Sportswriters from New York (state)